The 2022 Serbia Open was a tennis tournament played on outdoor clay courts. It was the 6th edition of the tournament and was classified as an ATP Tour 250 event on the 2022 ATP Tour. The event took place in Belgrade, Serbia, from 18 to 24 April 2022.

Champions

Singles

  Andrey Rublev def.  Novak Djokovic, 6–2, 6–7(4–7), 6–0

Men's doubles

  Ariel Behar /  Gonzalo Escobar def.  Nikola Mektić /  Mate Pavić, 6–2, 3–6, [10–7]

Points and prize money

Point distribution

Prize money 

*per team

Singles main draw entrants

Seeds

1 Rankings are as of 11 April 2022

Other entrants
The following players received wildcards into the main draw:
  Mikhail Kukushkin 
  Hamad Međedović 
  Alejandro Tabilo

The following player received entry using a protected ranking into the singles main draw:
  Aljaž Bedene

The following players received entry from the qualifying draw:
  Taro Daniel 
  Jiří Lehečka 
  Thiago Monteiro
  Roman Safiullin

Withdrawals 
  Benjamin Bonzi → replaced by  João Sousa
  Borna Ćorić → replaced by  Aljaž Bedene
  Hugo Gaston → replaced by  Henri Laaksonen
  Alex Molčan → replaced by  Mikael Ymer
  Gaël Monfils → replaced by  Marco Cecchinato

Doubles main draw entrants

Seeds

 Rankings are as of 4 April 2022

Other entrants
The following pairs received wildcards into the doubles main draw:
  Hamad Međedović /  Jakub Menšík
  Ivan Sabanov /  Matej Sabanov

Withdrawals 
 Before the tournament
  Benjamin Bonzi /  Hugo Gaston → replaced by  Lloyd Glasspool /  Harri Heliövaara

References

External links 
Official website of the tournament
(ATP) tournament profile

Serbia Open
Serbia Open
Serbia Open
Serbia Open